William Francis James (May 23, 1873 – November 17, 1945) was a soldier and politician from the U.S. state of Michigan.

Biography
James was born in Morristown, New Jersey, and moved with his parents to Hancock, Michigan, in 1876, where he attended the public schools. He attended Albion College in Albion, Michigan, in 1890 and 1891.

James was treasurer of Houghton County, Michigan, 1900–1904, and engaged in the real estate and insurance business. He served as a private in Company F of the Thirty-fourth Regiment, Michigan Volunteer Infantry, during the Spanish–American War. He was a member of the board of aldermen of Hancock, 1906–1908, and was mayor of Hancock in 1908 and 1909. He was member of the Michigan Senate, 1910–1914.

In 1914, James defeated incumbent Democrat William J. MacDonald to be elected as a Republican from Michigan's 12th congressional district to the 64th United States Congress. He was subsequently re-elected to the nine succeeding Congresses, serving from March 4, 1915, to January 3, 1935. He was chairman of the Committee on Military Affairs in the 71st Congress. He was an unsuccessful candidate for reelection in 1934 and 1936, losing both times to Democrat Frank E. Hook in the general election.

James died in Arlington, Virginia, and was interred in Arlington National Cemetery.

References

 The Political Graveyard

1873 births
1945 deaths
County treasurers in Michigan
People from Morristown, New Jersey
Republican Party Michigan state senators
Mayors of places in Michigan
Michigan city council members
United States Army soldiers
Albion College alumni
Burials at Arlington National Cemetery
Republican Party members of the United States House of Representatives from Michigan
American military personnel of the Spanish–American War
20th-century American politicians